Maus is a series of Pulitzer Prize-winning graphic novel style books written by Art Spiegelman.

Maus may also refer to:
 Maus (band), an Icelandic rock band
 Maus Castle, a castle in Rhineland-Palatinate, Germany
 MAUS mine, an Italian designed anti-personnel scatter mine
Maus Frères (Maus Brothers), Swiss holding company
 Die Sendung mit der Maus, a children's television show from Germany
 Panzer VIII Maus, a German World War II super-heavy tank

People with the name
August Maus (1915–1996), German U-boat commander
Codey Maus (born 1985), Canadian curler
Guido Maus (born 1964), Belgian-born American art curator and collector
Jacques Maus (1905–unknown), Belgian bob-sledder
John Maus (born 1980), American musician and composer
John Joseph Maus (1943–2011), American singer, songwriter and guitarist, known as John Walker of The Walker Brothers
John R. Maus, pilot of Northwest Airlines Flight 255
Julius Maus (1906–1934), German cyclist
Marcela Maus, American immunologist
Octave Maus (1856–1919), Belgian art critic, writer, and lawyer
Rodger Maus (1932–2017), American art director

See also 
 Mau (disambiguation)
 Maws (disambiguation)
 Herbert De Maus (1871–1929), New Zealand cricketer 
 Die Fledermaus (The Bat), a comic operetta in three acts by Johann Strauss II
 DarkMaus, a video game